Adam Mair (born February 15, 1979) is a Canadian former professional ice hockey centre who played in the National Hockey League (NHL) with the Toronto Maple Leafs, Los Angeles Kings, Buffalo Sabres and the New Jersey Devils. He is currently a player development coach for the Buffalo Sabres.

Playing career
Mair was drafted 84th overall by the Toronto Maple Leafs in the 1997 NHL Entry Draft. He joined the Maple Leafs for five games in the 1999 Stanley Cup Playoffs, recording a goal and 14 penalty minutes. However, he spent the majority of the 1999–2000 season in the AHL with the St. John's Maple Leafs. The Leafs traded Mair at the Trade Deadline in 2001, acquiring defenseman Aki Berg from the Los Angeles Kings.

Mair split time in the 2001–02 season between the AHL and NHL, and was hurt for a good amount of the season.  In a December 20, 2001, game against the Ottawa Senators, Mair was assessed 47 penalty minutes after he left the Kings bench to join a fight that had broken out between the two teams behind Kings goaltender Felix Potvin.  As the two teams fought, Mair's teammate Mikko Eloranta squared off with Senator's enforcer Chris Neil.  Seeing that Eloranta was at an obvious disadvantage, Mair left the Kings bench and tackled Neil.  The next day it was announced that Mair had received an automatic 10-game suspension for leaving the bench to join a fight.  The Kings decided to trade Mair to the Buffalo Sabres on July 24, in exchange for former first round draft pick Erik Rasmussen. Mair has become a popular player, with his effort and his aggression.

Mair set a personal high in games played and assists and tied a personal record in goals in 2003–04. His 2005–06 season was plagued by concussions. He missed a total of 31 regular season games due to concussion symptoms after a collision with Tyson Nash of the Phoenix Coyotes on January 12, 2006. He missed the remainder of the 2006 regular season, as well as the first two rounds of the playoffs, and did not appear for his first playoff game until game five of the third round versus the Carolina Hurricanes. Mair was named an alternate captain on February 4, 2008, under the Sabres 2007–08 rotating captains and alternate captains system.

On November 9, 2009, the Buffalo Sabres placed Adam Mair on waivers. The 24-hour deadline passed with no team claiming Mair. The Sabres did have the option of sending him to the AHL Portland Pirates, but head coach Lindy Ruff decided to keep him up with the Sabres instead.

On September 17, 2010, Mair was invited by the New Jersey Devils on a tryout contract for the team, he eventually signed with New Jersey on October 12, 2010.

After his final professional season with the Springfield Falcons of the AHL in 2011–12, Mair announced his retirement and accepted the role of Director of Player Development at Canisius College on October 22, 2012.

On June 17, 2015, Mair was hired by the Buffalo Sabres as a player development coach.

Career statistics

Regular season and playoffs

International

References

External links

1979 births
Living people
Buffalo Sabres coaches
Buffalo Sabres players
Canadian ice hockey right wingers
Ice hockey people from Ontario
Los Angeles Kings players
Manchester Monarchs (AHL) players
New Jersey Devils players
Owen Sound Platers players
St. John's Maple Leafs players
Sportspeople from Hamilton, Ontario
Springfield Falcons players
Toronto Maple Leafs draft picks
Toronto Maple Leafs players
Canadian ice hockey coaches